The Suveren Military Cemetery is a military cemetery in village Suveren of Iğdır, Iğdır Province in Turkey.

History 
The cemetery was established in 1945 for 45 soldiers of Turkish Military that was killed in Turkish-Armenian front of the Turkish War of Independence and Ararat Rebellion. Cemetery was restored in 2009.

References 

Monuments and memorials in Turkey
Turkish military memorials and cemeteries
Monuments and memorials in Iğdır